Ivan Krevs (21 November 1912 – 24 October 1990) was a Yugoslav long-distance runner. He competed in the men's 5000 metres at the 1936 Summer Olympics.

References

External links
 

1912 births
1990 deaths
Athletes (track and field) at the 1936 Summer Olympics
Slovenian male long-distance runners
Yugoslav male long-distance runners
Olympic athletes of Yugoslavia
Place of birth missing